The Carlos Palanca Memorial Awards for Literature winners in the year 1993 (rank, title of winning entry, name of author).


English division
Novel
Grand prizes: “Killing Time in a Warm Place” by Jose Y. Dalisay Jr.; and “Subanons” ni Antonio R. Enriquez Badingin

Short story
First prize: “The Axolatl Colony” by Jaime An Lim
Second prize: “Molde Perdido” by Myra L. Go
Third prize: “Blood on the Moon” by Mig Alvarez Enriquez

Short story for children
First prize: “The Man Who Hated Birds” by Leoncio P. Deriada
Second prize: “The Boy and the Tree of Time” by Jaime An Lim; and “The Pillow Cat” by Marivi Soliven
Third prize: “Little Bird, Little Fish and the Elephant” by Victorino Manalo; and “The Bamboo Who Wanted to Become a Christmas Tree” by Erlinda Acacio Flores

Poetry
First prize: “Poems for Muddas” by Anthony L. Tan
Second prize: “In Time Passing and Other Poems” by Elsa Martinez Coscolluela
Third prize: “Excerpt from the Unfinished Life” by Mariano Kilates

Essay
First prize: “Undoing Secrets” by Ma. Luisa A. Igloria
Second prize: “Listening to My Father” by Victorino Manalo
Third prize: “Bad Boy, Robin, Baad, Baad Boy” by Jessica Zafra

One-act play
First prize: “Paper Anniversary” by Corinna Esperanza A. Nuqui
Second prize: “And There Was Light” by Edelisa C. Cruz
Third prize: “A Jewel for Two” by Ruby Senatin

Full-length play
First prize: “The Comfort of Women” by Elsa Martinez Coscolluela
Second prize: “Death in the Form of A Rose” by Anton Juan Jr.
Third prize: “Besame Mucho, Love Me Forever” by Rolando S. Tinio

Filipino division
Novel
Grand prizes: “Bulaklak ng Maynila” by Domingo G. Landicho; and “Moog” by Buenaventura S. Medina Jr.

Short story
First prize: “Rosal” by  Mayette Bayuga
Second prize: “Kamusta na Bok?” by Marco A.V. Lopez
Third prize: “Lihim sa Tag-araw” by Honorio Bartolome De Dios; and “Wala sa Sarili” by Froilan Sempio Medina

Short story for children
First prize: “Kuwento ni Malinis” by Rene O. Villanueva
Second prize: “Si Burnay, ang Batang Palayok” by Augie D. Rivera Jr.
Third prize: “Ang Paglalakbay ni Butirik, ang Dyip na Masungit” by Adora Balmes

Poetry
First prize: “Pangunungkan at iba pang Saliksik” by Roberto T. Añonuevo
Second prize: “Ang Lunes na Mahirap Bunuin” by Nicolas B. Pichay
Third prize: ”Ilang Pagtutuwid sa Paraan ng Pagtawid” by Fidel Rillo, Jr.

Essay
First prize: “May Katulong sa Aking Sopas” by Reuel Molina Aguila
Second prize: “Soledad: Ang Mga Babae sa Kanilang Pag-iisa” by Glecy C. Atienza
Third prize: “Paano ba Umuwi Sa Sariling Bayan” by Cesar Aljama

One-act play
First prize: No winner
Second prize: “Kristo Tagala” by Ramon C. Jocson and Fernando Villarca Cao
Third prize: “Madumi” by Allan L. Palileo

Full-length play
First prize: “Separasyon” by Lito Casaje
Second prize: “Aninag, Anino” by Jose Y. Dalisay Jr.
Third prize: “Ang Butihing Babae ng Timog” by Jose Y. Dalisay Jr.; and “Ang Ninoy ni Ninay” by Ramon C. Jocson

Teleplay
First prize: “Ang Kuwento ni A” by Rolando S. Tinio
Second prize: “Magnanakaw” by Rolando F. Santos
Third prize: “Karatula” by Mes De Guzman

References
 

Palanca Awards
Palanca Awards, 1993